Agincourt was built by James Laing & Sons and launched at Sunderland in 1844. She immediately transported convicts to Norfolk Island. Thereafter she traded widely, sailing to Australia, Aden, and South America. Her homeport changed to Spain at some point prior to 1870 and thereafter Lloyd's Register carried stale data until it ceased listing her in 1886.

Career
Origins: James Laing was aged 20 in 1843 when he took over his father's shipbuilding yard at Deptford. Agincourt was the first ship he launched. She was a full-rigged ship with imitation gunports. Her original name had been intended to be Abyssinia, but she was launched in 1844 for Duncan Dunbar as Agincourt. Laing went on to make some 30 vessels for Dunbar over the next 20 years.

Agincourt entered Lloyd's Register in 1844 with Neatby, master, Laing & Co., owner, and trade London–Sydney.

Convict transport (1844): Captain Henry Neatby, with Surgeon Charles Henry Fuller, sailed from Woolwich on 8 July 1844. Agincourt was at the Cape of Good Hope on 24 September and stayed there a week, taking on water. She arrived at Norfolk Island on 9 November. She had embarked 224 convicts and disembarked 220, three having died on the voyage. One may have escaped at the Cape.

Immigrant voyages: Agincourt also made numerous voyages carrying government-assisted or independent immigrants to Australia.

Agincourt left Gravesend on 6 October 1849 and arrived at Port Adelaide on 31 January 1850. On this voyage she carried some 262 passengers. After delivering his passengers, Captain Cumberland carried a cargo to San Francisco. She arrived on 30 July  after a voyage of 130 days from Adelaide. Her cargo consisted of seven houses, 220 bags flour, 18,750 bricks, 1,500 feet of pine, 50 tons of coal, and oats, hay, and assorted goods.
Agincourt left Plymouth on 3 September 1855 and arrived at Port Adelaide on 3 December 1855
Agincourt left London on 22 March 1862 and arrived at Port Adelaide on 20 July 1862.

Ownership history
Duncan Dunbar, the first owner, died in 1862/1863. William Henry Haynes then acquired Agincourt. He first sailed her out of London, and then moved her homeport to Liverpool. In 1878 Spanish owners acquired Agincourt. They continued to have her surveyed and registered in Britain, but did not provide information on masters or her trade.

Lloyd's Register

Fate
Agincourt was last listed in Lloyd's Register in 1886 with unchanged information since 1880.

Citations and references
Citations

References

1844 ships
Age of Sail merchant ships of England
Convict ships to Norfolk Island